Seth Privacky (June 2, 1980 – July 15, 2010) was an American mass murderer who shot his parents, brother, his brother's girlfriend and his grandfather in Muskegon, Michigan on November 29, 1998, at the age of 18. He pled no contest and was convicted of five counts of murder and firearm charges. A friend, also 18, was charged with helping Privacky after the crimes but was acquitted at trial.

On July 15, 2010, Privacky was shot and killed during a failed prison escape attempt at Kinross Correctional Facility in Michigan's Upper Peninsula. Privacky and two other inmates overpowered the driver of a facilities semi-truck around 9:10 a.m. (ET) and tried to drive it through the double fence. Guards from the prison quickly apprehended two of the inmates, but Privacky tried to flee the truck once it stopped and was shot dead. All three attempted escapees were serving murder sentences.

See also
 List of homicides in Michigan

References

External links
  
 
 
  
 

1980 births
2010 deaths
American escapees
American mass murderers
American people convicted of murder
Deaths by firearm in Michigan
Familicides
Mass murder in Michigan
Mass shootings in Michigan
People from Muskegon, Michigan
People convicted of murder by Michigan
Prisoners who died in Michigan detention
People shot dead by law enforcement officers in the United States